The Geely Haoyue is a mid-size crossover SUV produced by the Chinese automaker Geely. It is known as the Geely Okavango in overseas markets. The Haoyue name means 'heroic', while Okavango is named after the Okavango Delta in Botswana.

Overview 
The standard transmission of the Geely Haoyue is a 7-speed dual-clutch automatic transmission with front-wheel-drive, and AWD available as an option. A  2.0-litre turbo engine co-developed with Volvo was available later. The Haoyue was codenamed the VX11 during development.

Haoyue L 
The Haoyue L is a variant of the Haoyue, which was launched in December 2022. Acceleration figure takes 7.9 seconds from 0–100 km/h.

Sales

References

External links 

 Official website (China)

Haoyue
Cars introduced in 2020
2020s cars
Mid-size sport utility vehicles
Crossover sport utility vehicles
Front-wheel-drive vehicles
All-wheel-drive vehicles
Cars of China